Indústria Paranaense de Estruturas Ltda known as IPE Aeronaves, based in the neighborhood of Batel in Curitiba, Paraná (state), is manufacturer, specialising in gliders and general aviation.

Aircraft

See also
Indústria Aeronáutica Neiva
Companhia Aeronáutica Paulista
Indústria Paulista de Aeronáutica

References

External links

Aircraft manufacturers of Brazil
Glider manufacturers
Companies based in Paraná (state)
Brazilian brands